Profundiconus jeanmartini is a species of sea snail, a marine gastropod mollusk in the family Conidae, the cone snails and their allies.

Like all species within the genus Profundiconus, these cone snails are predatory and venomous. They are capable of "stinging" humans, therefore live ones should be handled carefully or not at all.

Description
The size of the shell varies between 25 mm and 67 mm.

Distribution
This marine species occurs off Réunion and Sulawesi, Indonesia.

References

 Raybaudi, GM, 1992 . Aantekeningen over het geslacht Profundiconus (Kuroda, 1956) en beschrijving van een nieuwe soort (Gastropoda: Conidae) . The Conchiglia 263 : 46–47
 Tucker J.K. & Tenorio M.J. (2009) Systematic classification of Recent and fossil conoidean gastropods. Hackenheim: Conchbooks. 296 pp.

External links
 The Conus Biodiversity website
 
 Holotype in MNHN, Paris

jeanmartini
Gastropods described in 1992